Angus Mabey is a New Zealand professional rugby union referee.

Refereeing career
Mabey has been refereeing since his early teens, splitting his time between refereeing and as a Radio producer. In 2021, he was named  as a member of the New Zealand national referee squad.

References

New Zealand rugby union referees
Living people
Year of birth missing (living people)
Super Rugby referees